Trévadine Reservoir is a reservoir in the Haute-Corse department of France, on the island of Corsica. It stores water for drinking and irrigation, which is fed to reservoirs in the coastal plain.

Dam

The Trévadine Reservoir is in the commune of Ghisoni.
The dam impounds the Fiumorbo river below the Sampolo Reservoir and the Défilé de l'Inzecca.
The D344 road passes its northeast shore.
The dam is owned and operated by Électricité de France (EDF), and came into service in 1991.
It impounds  of water.

The 44 MW Trévadine hydroelectric plant, which receives water from the Sampolo Reservoir, discharges into the south of the Trévadine Reservoir.
The plant and the downstream water reservoir have been the main economic driver for the village of Lugo-di-Nazza to the south.

Operations

The reservoir supplies water to the reservoirs in the plain: the  Bacciana Reservoir, the  Teppe Rosse Reservoir and the  Alzitone Reservoir.
The reservoirs in turn deliver water using gravity.

Downstream a network of distribution pipes carries water to users in the municipalities of Prunelli-di-Fiumorbo, Serra-di-Fiumorbo, Ventiseri and Solaro.

In summer the Fium'Orbu continue to supply  to the reservoirs, but delivery of water to users requires operation of pumping stations.

Ecology

The reservoir has low biological significance.
Flora include Montpellier cistus (Cistus monspeliensis), yellow flatsedge (Cyperus flavescens), wild carrot (Daucus carota), yellow fleabane (Dittrichia viscosa), 
black poplar (Populus nigra) and rough cocklebur (Xanthium strumarium).

Notes

Citations

Sources

Reservoirs of Haute-Corse